The 2015 Alabama State Hornets baseball team represented Alabama State University during the 2015 NCAA Division I baseball season. The Hornets played their home games at the Wheeler–Watkins Baseball Complex as a member of the Southwestern Athletic Conference. They were led by head coach Mervyl Melendez, in his fourth season at Alabama State.

Previous season
In 2014, the Hornets finished the season as champions of the SWAC's East division with a record of 37–20, 21–3 in conference play. They qualified for the 2014 Southwestern Athletic Conference baseball tournament, and were eliminated in the finals. They failed to qualify for the 2014 NCAA Division I baseball tournament.

Personnel

Roster

Coaching staff

Schedule

! style="" | Regular Season
|- valign="top" 

|- bgcolor="#ffbbbb"
| February 13 || vs. #12 Louisville ||  || Bright House Field • Clearwater, FL || L 1–5 || Funkhouser (1–0) || Renda (0–1) ||  || 375 || 0–1 || –
|- bgcolor="#bbffbb"
| February 14 || vs. #17 Cal State Fullerton ||  || Bright House Field • Clearwater, FL || W 3–2 || Camacho (1–0) || Chambers (0–1) || Ruiz (1) || 425 || 1–1 || –
|- bgcolor="#ffbbbb"
| February 15 || vs. South Florida ||  || Bright House Field • Clearwater, FL || L 4–12 || Lawson (1–0) || Taylor (0–1) ||  || 575 || 1–2 || –
|- bgcolor="#ffbbbb"
| February 18 || at  ||  || Plainsman Park • Auburn, AL || L 5–7 || Lipscomb (1–0) || Bender (0–1) || Camp (2) || 1,876 || 1–3 || –
|- bgcolor="#bbffbb"
| February 21 || Florida A&M ||  || Wheeler–Watkins Baseball Complex • Montgomery, AL || W 11–3 || Renda (1–1) || Jarrell (0–1) ||  || 131 || 2–3 || –
|- bgcolor="#bbffbb"
| February 21 || Florida A&M ||  || Wheeler–Watkins Baseball Complex • Montgomery, AL || W 7–1 || Camacho (2–0) || Carrasco (0–2) ||  || 131 || 3–3 || –
|- bgcolor="#bbbbbb"
| February 22 || Florida A&M ||  || Wheeler–Watkins Baseball Complex • Montgomery, AL || colspan=7| Suspended Makeup date TBA
|- bgcolor="#ffbbbb"
| February 24 ||  ||  || Wheeler–Watkins Baseball Complex • Montgomery, AL || L 3–6 || McKinley (1–0) || Pantoja (0–1) || Taylor (1) || 75 || 3–4 || –
|- bgcolor="#bbbbbb"
| February 25 ||  ||  || Wheeler–Watkins Baseball Complex • Montgomery, AL || colspan=7| Postponed Rescheduled for May 6
|- bgcolor="#ffbbbb"
| February 27 || at The Citadel ||  || Joseph P. Riley Jr. Park • Charleston, SC || L 8–9 || Hunter (1–1) || Ruiz (0–1) ||  || 215 || 3–5 || –
|- bgcolor="#bbffbb"
| February 28 || at The Citadel ||  || Joseph P. Riley Jr. Park • Charleston, SC || W 15–14 || Estevez (1–0) || Connell (0–1) || Ruiz (2) || 226 || 4–5 || –
|-

|- bgcolor="#bbbbbb"
| March 1 || at The Citadel ||  || Joseph P. Riley Jr. Park • Charleston, SC || colspan=7| Cancelled
|- bgcolor="#bbffbb"
| March 3 ||  ||  || Wheeler–Watkins Baseball Complex • Montgomery, AL || W 12–8 || Caples (1–0) || Harris (0–1) ||  || 375 || 5–5 || –
|- bgcolor="#ffbbbb"
| March 8 || at  ||  || Magnolia Field • Itta Bena, MS || L 2–3 || Case (1–1) || Renda (1–2) ||  || 70 || 5–6 || 0–1
|- bgcolor="#bbffbb"
| March 8 || at Mississippi Valley State ||  || Magnolia Field • Itta Bena, MS || W 12–2 (7) || Camacho (3–0) || Sheppeard (0–3) ||  || 115 || 6–6 || 1–1
|- bgcolor="#bbffbb"
| March 9 || at Mississippi Valley State ||  || Magnolia Field • Itta Bena, MS || W 10–3 || McIntosh (1–0) || Kinney (0–1) ||  || 150 || 7–6 || 2–1
|- bgcolor="#bbffbb"
| March 15 || at  ||  || McGowan Stadium • Lorman, MS || W 4–1 || Renda (2–2) || Laird (1–3) || Ruiz (3) || 103 || 8–6 || 3–1
|- bgcolor="#bbffbb"
| March 15 || at Alcorn State ||  || McGowan Stadium • Lorman, MS || W 8–0 || Camacho (4–0) || Belmont (1–4) ||  || 91 || 9–6 || 4–1
|- bgcolor="#bbffbb"
| March 16 || at Alcorn State ||  || McGowan Stadium • Lorman, MS || W 12–1 (7) || McIntosh (2–0) || Walker (0–1) ||  || 130 || 10–6 || 5–1
|- bgcolor="#ffbbbb"
| March 17 || at South Alabama ||  || Eddie Stanky Field • Mobile, AL || L 2–9 || Stephens (1–1) || Caples (1–1) ||  || 1,224 || 10–7 || –
|- bgcolor="#bbffbb"
| March 18 ||  ||  || Wheeler–Watkins Baseball Complex • Montgomery, AL || W 3–1 || Tellado (1–0) || McCreless (0–1) || Ruiz (4) || 215 || 11–7 || –
|- bgcolor="#ffbbbb"
| March 21 ||  ||  || Wheeler–Watkins Baseball Complex • Montgomery, AL || L 3–6 || Smith (2–2) || Renda (2–3) || Utterback (4) || 118 || 11–8 || 5–2
|- bgcolor="#bbffbb"
| March 21 || Alabama A&M ||  || Wheeler–Watkins Baseball Complex • Montgomery, AL || W 6–2 || Camacho (5–0) || Ahrens (4–1) ||  || 87 || 12–8 || 6–2
|- bgcolor="#bbffbb"
| March 22 || Alabama A&M ||  || Wheeler–Watkins Baseball Complex • Montgomery, AL || W 8–7 || Ruiz (1–1) || Smith (1–3) ||  || 105 || 13–8 || 7–2
|- align="center" bgcolor=""
| March 24 ||  ||  || Wheeler–Watkins Baseball Complex • Montgomery, AL ||  ||  ||  ||  ||  ||  ||
|- align="center" bgcolor=""
| March 25 || at Florida State ||  || Dick Howser Stadium • Tallahassee, FL ||  ||  ||  ||  ||  ||  ||
|- align="center" bgcolor=""
| March 28 ||  ||  || Wheeler–Watkins Baseball Complex • Montgomery, AL ||  ||  ||  ||  ||  ||  ||
|- align="center" bgcolor=""
| March 28 || Jackson State ||  || Wheeler–Watkins Baseball Complex • Montgomery, AL ||  ||  ||  ||  ||  ||  ||
|- align="center" bgcolor=""
| March 29 || Jackson State ||  || Wheeler–Watkins Baseball Complex • Montgomery, AL ||  ||  ||  ||  ||  ||  ||
|- align="center" bgcolor=""
| March 31 || at Troy ||  || Riddle–Pace Field • Troy, AL ||  ||  ||  ||  ||  ||  ||
|-

|- align="center" bgcolor=""
| April 3 ||  ||  || Wheeler–Watkins Baseball Complex • Montgomery, AL ||  ||  ||  ||  ||  ||  ||
|- align="center" bgcolor=""
| April 4 || Savannah State ||  || Wheeler–Watkins Baseball Complex • Montgomery, AL ||  ||  ||  ||  ||  ||  ||
|- align="center" bgcolor=""
| April 4 || Savannah State ||  || Wheeler–Watkins Baseball Complex • Montgomery, AL ||  ||  ||  ||  ||  ||  ||
|- align="center" bgcolor=""
| April 7 || Jacksonville State ||  || Wheeler–Watkins Baseball Complex • Montgomery, AL ||  ||  ||  ||  ||  ||  ||
|- align="center" bgcolor=""
| April 11 || Mississippi Valley State ||  || Wheeler–Watkins Baseball Complex • Montgomery, AL ||  ||  ||  ||  ||  ||  ||
|- align="center" bgcolor=""
| April 11 || Mississippi Valley State ||  || Wheeler–Watkins Baseball Complex • Montgomery, AL ||  ||  ||  ||  ||  ||  ||
|- align="center" bgcolor=""
| April 12 || Mississippi Valley State ||  || Wheeler–Watkins Baseball Complex • Montgomery, AL ||  ||  ||  ||  ||  ||  ||
|- align="center" bgcolor=""
| April 14 || at Auburn ||  || Plainsman Park • Auburn, AL ||  ||  ||  ||  ||  ||  ||
|- align="center" bgcolor=""
| April 15 || at Jacksonville State ||  || Rudy Abbott Field • Jacksonville, AL ||  ||  ||  ||  ||  ||  ||
|- align="center" bgcolor=""
| April 18 || Alcorn State ||  || Wheeler–Watkins Baseball Complex • Montgomery, AL ||  ||  ||  ||  ||  ||  ||
|- align="center" bgcolor=""
| April 18 || Alcorn State ||  || Wheeler–Watkins Baseball Complex • Montgomery, AL ||  ||  ||  ||  ||  ||  ||
|- align="center" bgcolor=""
| April 19 || Alcorn State ||  || Wheeler–Watkins Baseball Complex • Montgomery, AL ||  ||  ||  ||  ||  ||  ||
|- align="center" bgcolor=""
| April 21 || at Samford ||  || Joe Lee Griffin Stadium • Homewood, AL ||  ||  ||  ||  ||  ||  ||
|- align="center" bgcolor=""
| April 25 || at Alabama A&M ||  || Bulldog Field • Normal, AL ||  ||  ||  ||  ||  ||  ||
|- align="center" bgcolor=""
| April 25 || at Alabama A&M ||  || Bulldog Field • Normal, AL ||  ||  ||  ||  ||  ||  ||
|- align="center" bgcolor=""
| April 26 || at Alabama A&M ||  || Bulldog Field • Normal, AL ||  ||  ||  ||  ||  ||  ||
|-

|- align="center" bgcolor=""
| May 2 || at Jackson State ||  || Braddy Field • Jackson, MS ||  ||  ||  ||  ||  ||  ||
|- align="center" bgcolor=""
| May 2 || at Jackson State ||  || Braddy Field • Jackson, MS ||  ||  ||  ||  ||  ||  ||
|- align="center" bgcolor=""
| May 3 || at Jackson State ||  || Braddy Field • Jackson, MS ||  ||  ||  ||  ||  ||  ||
|- align="center" bgcolor=""
| May 5 || at UAB ||  || Jerry D. Young Memorial Field • Birmingham, AL ||  ||  ||  ||  ||  ||  ||
|- align="center" bgcolor=""
| May 6 || UAB ||  || Wheeler–Watkins Baseball Complex • Montgomery, AL ||  ||  ||  ||  ||  ||  ||
|-

|- 
! style="" | Post-Season
|-

|- align="center"
|  || May 13 || TBD || || Wesley Barrow Stadium • New Orleans, LA ||  ||  ||  ||  ||  ||  || 
|-

|-
| style="font-size:88%"| All rankings from Collegiate Baseball.

References

Alabama State Hornets
Alabama State Hornets baseball seasons
Alabama State Horn